This is a list of public art in Soho, a district in the City of Westminster, London. Soho is an area first developed in the 1670s which, since the construction of theatres along Shaftesbury Avenue in the 19th century, has had a strong association with the entertainment industry.

In the south of the district stands Leicester Square, the public sculpture of which has had an eventful history. From 1748 the square had as its centrepiece an equestrian figure of George I, but this deteriorated and was sold off at the beginning of the following century. In 1874 the square was bought by Albert Grant, a company promoter and MP, who had its gardens made over to a design by James Knowles. This refurbishment saw the installation of the Shakespeare fountain and busts of four historical residents of the locale: Isaac Newton, William Hogarth, Joshua Reynolds and John Hunter. Each of these busts was positioned near the site of its subject's former home. The busts were severely damaged by inept restoration work in the 1990s.

A renovation of Leicester Square carried out between 2010 and 2012 was criticised for its removal of all of the sculptures on the square except for that of Shakespeare. The 1981 statue of Charlie Chaplin which had been displaced as a result of these works returned to the square in 2016. In 2020, Chaplin's statue was joined by several others also on the theme of cinema, which together comprise the sculptural trail Scenes in the Square.

References

Bibliography

 

 

 

 

Soho
Public art